Epirrhoe tartuensis is a moth of the family Geometridae. It is known from Finland, the Baltic States and adjacent Russia.

The wingspan is about 24–29 mm. Adults are on wing from June to July.

The larvae feed on Galium species. Larvae can be found from mid June to August. It overwinters as a pupa.

External links

Fauna Europaea
Lepiforum.de

Epirrhoe
Moths of Europe